Aurel Silviu Panait (born 27 August 1968) is a Romanian former footballer who played as a defender and midfielder.

International career
Aurel Panait played one friendly game at international level for Romania, when coach Cornel Dinu sent him on the field to replace Ilie Dumitrescu in the 69th minute of a 2–0 victory against Latvia.

Honours
Petrolul Ploiești
Divizia B: 1988–89
Steaua București
Divizia A: 1992–93, 1993–94, 1994–95, 1995–96
Cupa României: 1991–92, 1995–96
Supercupa României: 1994, 1995 
Dynamo Berlin
NOFV-Oberliga Nord: 1991–92

References

1968 births
Living people
Romanian footballers
Romania international footballers
Association football defenders
Liga I players
Liga II players
2. Liga (Austria) players
2. Bundesliga players
FC Petrolul Ploiești players
FC Steaua București players
Wuppertaler SV players
1. FSV Mainz 05 players
SV Wehen Wiesbaden players
Berliner FC Dynamo players
Romanian expatriate footballers
Expatriate footballers in Austria
Romanian expatriate sportspeople in Austria
Expatriate footballers in Germany
Romanian expatriate sportspeople in Germany
Sportspeople from Ploiești